Vladimir Berkovich is a mathematician at the Weizmann Institute of Science who introduced Berkovich spaces. His Ph.D. advisor was Yuri I. Manin.  Berkovich was a visiting scholar at the Institute for Advanced Study in 1991-92 and again in the summer of 2000.

In 1998 he was an Invited Speaker of the International Congress of Mathematicians in Berlin. In 2012 he became a fellow of the American Mathematical Society.

Selected publications

References

External links
 Personal page of Vladimir Berkovich at the Weizmann Institute of Science
 

Living people
Institute for Advanced Study visiting scholars
Academic staff of Weizmann Institute of Science
20th-century Israeli mathematicians
21st-century Israeli mathematicians
Fellows of the American Mathematical Society
Year of birth missing (living people)